Herman Charles Quirmbach (born October 6, 1950) is an American politician and academic. He is currently serving as a member of the Iowa Senate from the 23rd district. A Democrat, he has served in the Iowa Senate since 2003 and served on the Ames City Council from 1995 to 2003.

Early life 
Quirmbach was born on October 6, 1950, in St. Paul, Minnesota. He grew up in Mahtomedi, Minnesota, and Brookfield, Wisconsin. He graduated from Central High School and then received his bachelors' of arts degree in government from Harvard University, where he roomed with biochemist and Nobel laureate Roger Y. Tsien. He earned his masters and Ph.D. in economics from Princeton University, after completing a doctoral dissertation "Input prices and the horizontal and vertical structure of industry."

Career 
After earning his doctoral degree, Quirmbach became an associate professor of economics at Iowa State University.

Quirmbach currently serves on several committees in the Iowa Senate—the Education committee; the Human Resources committee; the Judiciary committee; and the Ways and Means committee; and the Local Government committee, where he is chair. He also serves as vice chair of the Education Appropriations Subcommittee.

Quirmbach was re-elected in 2006 with 11,782 votes (57%), defeating Republican opponent Linda Livingston.

References

External links
 Senator Herman Quirmbach official Iowa Legislature site
Senator Herman Quirmbach official Iowa General Assembly site
State Senator Herman Quirmbach official constituency site

Living people
1950 births
Harvard College alumni
Princeton University alumni
Iowa State University faculty
Politicians from Ames, Iowa
Politicians from Saint Paul, Minnesota
Iowa city council members
Democratic Party Iowa state senators
21st-century American politicians
20th-century American economists
21st-century American economists